Aline Charlotte Olvera Clauzier (born 2 November 1982) is a Mexican rower. She competed in the women's lightweight double sculls event at the 2004 Summer Olympics.

Notes

References

External links
 

1982 births
Living people
Mexican female rowers
Olympic rowers of Mexico
Rowers at the 2004 Summer Olympics
Rowers from Mexico City
Pan American Games medalists in rowing
Pan American Games bronze medalists for Mexico
Rowers at the 2003 Pan American Games